The abbé Jean-Marie Perrot, in Breton Yann Vari Perrot (3 September 1877 in Plouarzel, Finistère – 12 December 1943 in Scrignac), was a Breton priest, Breton independentist assassinated by the Communist resistance. He was the founder of the Breton Catholic movement Bleun-Brug.

Early life 
Perrot was raised in a provincial Breton-speaking family. After studying at the Institut des Frères des Écoles in Guingamp in 1889, he expressed a desire to become a priest. He left to study humanities at the Pont-Croix Youth Seminary. He spent one year in Brest with the 19th infantry regiment, then enrolled in the Quimper Seminary. He became vicar of Saint-Vougay in 1904, where he undertook the patronage of Paotred Sant-Nouga, where he formed study circles, a choir, and a theatre troupe for the local youth. He is the uncle of Louis Lalouer.

Activism for the Breton language
Perrot founded Bleun-Brug (Heather Flower) in 1905, which soon absorbed the magazine Feiz ha Breiz (Faith and Brittany), which he edited after 1911. The aims of the organisation were:

 to promote the Breton ideal in all three intellectual, political and economic arenas.
 to contribute, as Catholics, to the return of Brittany to the full exercise of its traditional faith.

He was named vicar of Saint-Thégonnec in March 1914. On the outbreak of war he was called up at Lesneven on 5 August but he asked to leave to volunteer for the Groupe des Brancardiers Divisionnaires. He was decorated after World War I. After 1910, he played an important role in the Emsav, the Breton nationalist movement.

In 1920, he was named vicar of Plouguerneau. In 1922 Yves Floc'h, the future painter worked as his parson. Perrot patronised Michel Le Noblez and organised theatrical performances. Yves Floc'h painted the scenery for a play, and his gifts were noticed by the vicar. From 1932, Perrot's secretary was Herry Caouissin.

Perrot wrote countless articles and plays expressing his ideology, most notably in Feiz ha Breiz.

He was initially stationed in a conservative Saint-Vougay parish, but was transferred to the more leftist area of Scrignac in 1930 by the episcopal hierarchy, who disliked his political activities. On 8 July 1941 he became part of the group of writers who adopted a unified orthography of the Breton language.

World War II
 
With the outbreak of war, hostility towards Perrot in Scrignac grew, as he was suspected of pro-German sympathies.

On 16 October 1939 telegraphic lines in the region of Huelgoat were cut. Perrot was accused by authorities of sabotage. The gendarmes searched his estate twice and interrogated him, but he was released as he had an alibi. However, one gendarme publicly accused him of cutting the wires, and Perrot accused the gendarme of defamation. Afterwards, an enquiry established that a military prisoner was responsible for cutting the wires. At the request of the colonel of the Gendarmie of Quimper, the abbé dropped his accusation of defamation.

During the war, he continued to produce Feiz ha Breiz. Braving the ban by Adolphe Duparc on celebrating nationalist anniversaries during the occupation, he organised the members of Bleun-Brug in Tréguier on the 29 and 30 August to celebrate the 500th anniversary of the death of Duke Jean V of Brittany. In October 1942, he was named a member of the Comité Consultatif de Bretagne (CCB), a non-elected council put in place by Regional Prefect Jean Quénette to put forward proposals relating to Breton language and culture.

In July 1941, Perrot took part in the German-sponsored effort to unify the writing of Breton.

Perrot sympathised strongly with the collaborationist Breton National Party. When his parsonage was partly requisitioned by the Germans, Perrot was accused of assisting them. According to Henri Fréville, on 7 August 1943 Perrot was questioned about the movements of members of Bagadou Stourm, Breton nationalist stormtroopers allied to the Nazis, who had stopped at Scrignac. He was hospitable toward the Bagadou Stourm Youth, who were most active around Finistère, where leaders such as Yann Goulet and L’Haridon had been arrested by the French police but released by the Germans.

Assassination
On 12 December 1943, aged 66, the abbé was killed by Jean Thépaut, a member of the French Communist Party following a series of denunciations of Perrot for alleged collaborationist activity.

Exploitation of his memory
After his death, the collaborator Célestin Lainé recruited about sixty men whom he organised under the name Bezen Kadoudal. Ael Péresse, second-in-command to Laîné, suggested naming the group after Perrot, so it became Bezen Perrot instead.

Legacy
Abbé Perrot was laid to rest at the chapel of Coat-Quéau, in Scrignac. His memory is often celebrated on Easter Monday. The role of abbé Perrot has been the source of much controversy about "the Breton cause", notably between Ronan Caouissin and the director of the theatre troupe Ar Vro Bagan

Unvaniez Koad Kev was a law association created to maintain the legacy of abbé Perrot. Since 1957, the association has been administered principally by Youenn Craff. Tepod Gwilhmod was president from 2001 to 2003. In 2005, a crisis arose over an attempted takeover by Gérard Hirel (French police officer, ex-member of the French far right party "National Front"), Roland de la Morinière, and Loig Kervoaz, all members of Adsav. The current president and chaplain are Yann Sanseau and abbot Blanchard.

Citations
Yvon Tranvouez, in Bretagne et identités régionales pendant la Seconde Guerre mondiale asserts that

Abbot Henri Poisson said in his book: 

Francis Gourvil in 1990:

Publications
 Alanik al Louarn. Pe "n'euz den fin n'en deuz e goulz". Pez c'hoari plijadurus rimet e daou Arvest, Brest, Moullerez "Ar c'hourrier", 1905
 Buez ar zent, Ar Gwaziou, Morlaix, 1911
 R. G. Berry, Eun nozveziad reo gwenn Translation from Welsh to Breton by Geraint Dyfnallt Owen and Jean-Marie Perrot of Noson o Farrug (One frosty night), (Plougerne, 1928). [Drama] Performed by Bleun-Brug theatre company inLesneven 1928. http://bibliotheque.idbe-bzh.org/document.php?id=eun-nozveziad-reo-gwenn-18682&l=fr
 Special 30th anniversary edition 1936 of Ouvres Bretonnes: http://bibliotheque.idbe-bzh.org/data/cle_52/Bulletin_de_lUnion_des_Oeuvres_Bretonnes_1936_nA78_.pdf

See also
Bleimor (Scouting)

References

1877 births
1943 deaths
20th-century French Roman Catholic priests
Assassinated activists
Assassinated French people
Breton collaborators with Nazi Germany
Breton nationalists
French military personnel of World War I
People from Finistère
People murdered in France
Christian fascists
Catholicism and far-right politics